Strontium perchlorate is a white powder or colorless crystals with the formula Sr(ClO4)2.

It is a strong oxidizer which gives red flames. It can be used in pyrotechnics; however, usually the more common strontium nitrate is used.  It is also used in Liquid Injection Thrust Vector Control (LITVC) in solid-propellant rockets to enable steering control with a simple fixed nozzle.

It can be prepared by oxidizing strontium chlorate with hypochlorites.

Strontium perchlorate forms a crystal structure in the orthorhombic space group Pbca which is comparable to that of calcium perchlorate.

References

Perchlorates
Strontium compounds